Félix Antonio Cruz Jiminián (Santo Domingo, November 19, 1951), better known as Dr. Cruz Jiminián, is a Dominican doctor of medicine, philanthropist and businessman.

Early years 
Dr. Félix Antonio Cruz Jiminián was born in Jarabacoa, on November 19, 1951. He is the son of Luis Cruz Collado and María Jiminian. He entered the Saint Thomas Aquinas Seminary to become a priest, although he later gave up the idea to become a doctor. Cruz Jiminián graduated in 1980 from the Autonomous University of Santo Domingo, with the title of doctor of medicine. When he finished his studies, he built a small office that only had a wooden table and a desk.

Philanthropy 
Cruz Jiminián is the founder of the Cruz Jiminián Clinic and Foundation located in the Cristo Rey slum, Dominican Republic. Despite not being a public hospital, the Cruz Jiminián clinic, like the foundation, is characterized by providing its patients with free quality services. Through these, Dr. Cruz Jiminián implements social assistance programs such as: cleft lip and palate surgery, imperforate anus, hydrocephalus, double sex, dental modules, medical operations, area for tuberculosis, vaccination area, dining room for the elderly, renal hemodialysis area, area for late birth declarations.

In 2015, Dr. Cruz Jiminián inaugurated with the Dominican President Danilo Medina the largest medical office building in the country to expand the medical and social services that he has offered for more than 30 years through his clinic and foundation.

Acknowledgments 
The National Human Rights Commission created the Supreme Laurel de Oro, Altruism and Peace award, in the Degree Doctor Félix Antonio Cruz Jiminián. He was also awarded as a Philanthropist of Dominican Medicine, by the Autonomous University of Santo Domingo

2010, he was recognized as "The Man of the Year" by the Grupo Omnimedia and the Diario Libre newspaper.

2013, the Council of Aldermen of the National District of the country declared him adopted son of the city of Santo Domingo.

2016, Dr. Juan Cabrera Abreu, wrote a 354-page book called An unforgettable story dedicated to the life of Dr. Cruz Jiminián.

In 2018, the former mayor of the Distrito Nacional, David Collado, inaugurated a park in the Parabel sector to honor Félix Cruz Jiminián.

References 

1951 births
Dominican Republic businesspeople
Dominican Republic philanthropists
Dominican Republic medical doctors
Living people